El Carate is a corregimiento in Las Tablas District, Los Santos Province, Panama with a population of 873 as of 2010. Its population as of 1990 was 723; its population as of 2000 was 831.

References

Corregimientos of Los Santos Province